Jan Palach is a Czech biographical film directed by Robert Sedláček. The film follows Jan Palach during 1968 and 1969 and shows the final 6 months of his life. The film premiered at Uherské Hradiště Summer Film School.

Plot
The film chronicles the life of Jan Palach from childhood until his death in 1969.

The film starts during Palach's childhood. Palach gets lost in the woods and wanders in snow while his family tries to find him. The film then cuts to 1967 when Palach goes on a student work trip to Kazakhstan. He befriends a young Russian who gets in trouble, but Palach stands up for him against his superior. Palach then visits France along with his friends. He enjoys his time there until he finds out about the Warsaw Pact invasion of Czechoslovakia which shocks him. Palach decides to return to Czechoslovakia. He hears about the self-immolation of Ryszard Siwiec. Palach participates in a strike against invasion and tries to be active but is disappointed with the passiveness of society. He eventually decides to self-immolate himself against the invasion. The film ends with a shot of his burnt face.

Cast

 Viktor Zavadil as Jan Palach
 Zuzana Bydžovská as Libuše Palachová
 Denisa Barešová as Helenka
 Kristína Kanátová as Eva
 Michal Balcar as Jiří Palach
 Karel Jirák as Ladislav Žižka
 Jan Vondráček as Professor
Jiří Zapletal as Josef Smrkovský
 Daniel Želatý as Jakub Schwarz Trojan
Gérard Robert Gratadour	
Simone Hrášková	
Patrik Paušo

Production
The film was shot at Prague, Milovice or Pardubice Square which was used instead of Wenceslas Square. Filmmakers created a scale model of Statue of Saint Wenceslas.  Self-immolation was shot with a stuntman at Střešovice.  Scenes from a church were shot at Evangelical Church at Libiš that was attended by Palach. Jakub Schwarz Trojan was played by his colleague Daniel Želatý.

Release
The film premiered at Uherské Hradiště Summer Film School on 5 August 2018. It was distributed for cinemas on 21 August 2018. The film was projected in 95 Czech cinemas during the first week after its release. It was attended by 13,129 people and grossed 1,900,000 CZK.

Reception 
The film received generally positive reviews from Czech critics. It holds 75% at Kinobox.cz. The film was awarded for 6 Czech Film Critics' Awards.

Accolades

References

External links

2018 films
2018 biographical drama films
Czech drama films
Czech historical films
2010s Czech-language films
Warsaw Pact invasion of Czechoslovakia
Drama films based on actual events
Czech Film Critics' Awards winners
2018 drama films
Czech films based on actual events